Jan Gunnarsson (born 30 May 1962) is a former tennis player from Sweden, who won one singles in Vienna in 1985 (beating Libor Pimek in the final) and nine doubles titles on the world tour during his professional career. In 1989 he reached the semi-finals of Australian Open where he lost in straight sets to Miloslav Mečíř.

Along with Michael Mortensen he won the longest tie-break in tennis history at Wimbledon in 1985. The Swedish/Danish duo defeated John Frawley and Víctor Pecci in the first round.

The right-hander reached his career-high ATP singles ranking of world No. 25 in December 1985.

Summer 2012 Olympics controversy

Gunnarsson was an expert commentator for the Summer 2012 Olympic Games. His position on Swedish television became controversial after he made xenophobic comments in response to negative comments made by the Swedish Culture and Sports Minister Lena Adelsohn Liljeroth about financial support for future Swedish applications for major championships. On his Facebook page, Gunnarsson posted the comment, "There's not enough money when the state is paying welfare for 27,000 Somalis." His comment was criticized by SVT's sports editor Per Yng, and he removed the comment shortly after.

Career finals

Singles (1 title, 4 runner-ups)

Doubles (9 titles, 10 runner-ups)

References

External links 
 
 
 

1962 births
Living people
People from Olofström Municipality
Swedish male tennis players
Sportspeople from Blekinge County
20th-century Swedish people